The 2016 Meistriliiga (known as A. Le Coq Premium Liiga for sponsorship reasons) was the 26th season of the Meistriliiga, the highest division of Estonian football system. The season began on 4 March 2016 and concluded on 5 November 2016.

Infonet won the league on the last matchday of the season, finishing with 80 points. It was their first league title.

Teams
A total of 10 teams will contest the league. These include 9 teams from the 2015 season and one promoted team from the 2015 Esiliiga: Tarvas, making their debut in the top flight. Tarvas replaces Tulevik who were relegated from the Meistriliiga after a single season. In the relegation play-off Tammeka successfully defended their league spot by defeating challengers Tallinna Kalev.

Stadia

Personnel and kits
Note: Flags indicate national team as has been defined under FIFA eligibility rules. Players and Managers may hold more than one non-FIFA nationality.

Managerial changes

League table

Relegation play-offs
At season's end Pärnu, the ninth place club, participated in a two-legged play-off with Maardu Linnameeskond, the runners-up (of independent teams) of the 2016 Esiliiga, for the spot in 2017 Meistriliiga.

Pärnu Linnameeskond won 9–4 on aggregate and retained their Meistriliiga spot for the 2017 season.

Results
Each team plays every opponent four times, twice at home and twice away, for a total of 36 games.

First half of season

Second half of season

Season statistics

Top scorers

Top assists

Hat-tricks

4 Player scored 4 goals.
5 Player scored 5 goals.

Awards

Monthly awards

Meistriliiga Player of the Year
Yevgeni Kabaev was named Meistriliiga Player of the Year.

See also
 2015–16 Estonian Cup
 2016–17 Estonian Cup
 2016 Esiliiga
 2016 Esiliiga B

References

Meistriliiga seasons
1
Estonia
Estonia